In dentistry, crown refers to the anatomical area of teeth, usually covered by enamel.  The crown is usually visible in the mouth after developing below the gingiva and then erupting into place. If part of the tooth gets chipped or broken, a dentist can apply an artificial crown. 
Artificial crowns are used most commonly to entirely cover a damaged tooth or to cover an implant. Bridges are also used to cover a space if one or more teeth is missing. They are cemented to natural teeth or implants surrounding the space where the tooth once stood.
There are various materials that can be used including a type of cement or stainless steel.  The cement crowns look like regular teeth while the stainless steel crowns are silver or gold.

References

Ash, Major M. and Stanley J. Nelson. Wheeler’s Dental Anatomy, Physiology, and Occlusion. 8th edition. 2003.  .

Parts of tooth
Human mouth anatomy